Zhigansk (Ecigeen) is a rural locality (a selo) and the administrative center of Zhigansky District in the Sakha Republic, Russia, located on the left bank of the Lena River near where it is joined by its tributary the Nuora (Strekalovka), approximately  northwest of Yakutsk, the capital of the republic. Population:

History
It was founded in 1632 as an ostrog by Cossacks led by Pyotr Beketov. In 1783, Zhigansk was granted town status and made the seat of a newly created uyezd within Yakutsk Oblast.  It lost this function in 1805 with the dissolution of the uyezd, but remained the most northerly town on the Lena until 1917, when it was demoted to rural status.

In 1930, Zhigansk became the administrative center of the newly created Zhigansky District, which was declared an "Evenk National District" due to its large population of Evenks. In 2002, Evenks represented around 47% of the local population and Yakuts a further 34%.

Transportation
Zhigansk is served by the Zhigansk Airport.

There is no year-round road access to Zhigansk, but during the summer months, Yakutsk is reachable via boat on the Lena. In the months when the river is frozen, a winter road also leads to Yakutsk.

Climate
Zhigansk has an extreme subarctic climate (Köppen climate classification: Dfd), though despite its extreme subarctic climate classification, the town is not quite as cold in winter as some towns with a similar climate, such as Verkhoyansk or Oymyakon, both of which are located further east in deep valleys where perpetual temperature inversions occur during the winter. Despite its Dfd classification, precipitation is somewhat higher in summer than at other times of the year, but like other extreme subarctic climates, its precipitation remains rather low year-round.

References

Notes

Sources
Official website of the Sakha Republic. Registry of the Administrative-Territorial Divisions of the Sakha Republic. Zhigansky District. 

Rural localities in Zhigansky District 
Road-inaccessible communities of the Sakha Republic
Populated places on the Lena River